Dan T Niles is an American entrepreneur, researcher, engineer and hedge fund manager.

Education 
Niles holds BS in Systems Engineering from Boston University and a MS in Electrical Engineering from Stanford University.

Career 
Niles began his career at Wall Street, then investment banker at Robertson Stephens. He later joined Lehman Brothers where he served as the senior sell-side equity research analyst covering computer hardware and semiconductors and consequently launched the Satori Fund. Niles also served as Managing Director at Neuberger Berman, Inc., and the Chief Executive Officer of Neuberger Berman Technology Management, LLC, the former general partner of the Satori Fund. 

Niles has also made several high-profile calls regarding Facebook’s disastrous IPO, Apple’s negative pre-announcement of earnings and the Stock Market Crash of 2020 that was caused by COVID-19 and the Russian-Saudi Oil Price War. He has profiled in CNBC, Business Insiders, Bloomberg News, Wall Street Journal and others.

References

American hedge fund managers
Living people